The Extraditables was a narcoterrorist organization created by Colombian drug lords in the mid 1980s. Their motto was: "We prefer a grave in Colombia to a prison in the United States."

The aim of the group was to intimidate the Colombian government into banning extradition at the constitutional level (Colombia had a treaty of extradition with the United States) and they wanted to manipulate Colombian society into supporting their goal. Initially, the group simply published newspaper adverts in which they defended their position, and influenced political parties to speak in favour of their goals. However, over time their actions escalated into a war between the state and the drug cartel, with violent acts committed against politicians and members of law enforcement.

Its members were largely drawn from the Medellín Cartel and others linked to the drug trafficking racket. Its principal leaders were:

 Pablo Escobar Gaviria, who was killed in 1993 on the roof of a house in Medellin.
 Gonzalo Rodríguez Gacha,  who was killed by Colombian military personnel by a bullet to the face in 1989.
 Fabio Ochoa Vásquez, sentenced to 30 years in federal prison in the United States.

See also 
 Toma del Palacio de Justicia
 Guerra contra el narcotráfico en Colombia

References

Organizations established in the 1980s
1980s establishments in Colombia
Organizations disestablished in the 1990s
1990s disestablishments in Colombia
Medellín Cartel
Extradition
Organized crime groups in Colombia